Athanasius II may refer to:

Pope Athanasius II of Alexandria (died 496),  Coptic Orthodox Pope
Athanasius II, Patriarch of Antioch (r. 683–686)
Athanasius II, Bishop-Duke of Naples (died 898)
Athanasius II of Jerusalem (fl. 1231–1244), Greek Orthodox Patriarch
Patriarch Athanasius II of Constantinople (r. 1450–1453)
Athanasius II Dabbas, Melkite Greek Patriarch of Antioch (r. 1611–1619)

See also
Atanasije II Gavrilović, Serbian Patriarch (r. 1747–1752)